A Landlady is a female landlord.

Landlady or variants may also refer to:

The Landlady (novella) – 1847 short fantasy and gothic story (also listed as a novelette or novella) by Russian writer Fyodor Dostoyevsky
"The Landlady" (short story) – 1959 short horror story by British writer Roald Dahl
Bariwali (The Landlady) – 2001 Bengali film

See also
Landlord (disambiguation)